Cuyahoga may refer to:

Places 
 Cuyahoga County, Ohio
 Cuyahoga Falls, Ohio
 Cuyahoga Heights, Ohio
 Cuyahoga River, northeast Ohio
 Cuyahoga Valley National Park, Ohio

Ships 
 , a U.S. Coast Guard Cutter that sank in the Chesapeake Bay in 1978 after a collision
 , built in 1927 and transferred from the United States Coast Guard to the Navy in 1933
 Cuyahoga (ship, 1943), a Maritimer, built to the design of the United States Maritime Commission, see Lower Lakes Towing

Song 
 "Cuyahoga" (song), a song by R.E.M. on their 1986 album Lifes Rich Pageant